Ate de Jong (born 1953 in Aardenburg, Zeeland, Netherlands) is a Dutch film director. He is best known as the producer of The Discovery of Heaven (2001), nominated for a Golden Calf award, and Het Bombardement (2012).

Filmography

Director
 Alle dagen feest (1976) (Every Day a Party)
 Blindgangers (1977) (Blind Spot)
 Dag Dokter (1978) (Inheritance)
 Bekende gezichten, gemengde gevoelens (1980) (Familiar Faces, Mixed Feelings)
 Een vlucht regenwulpen (1981) (A Flight of Rainbirds)
 Brandende liefde (1983) (Burning Love)
 In de schaduw van de overwinning (1986) (Shadow of Victory)
 Miami Vice (1 episode, 1987) - "Missing Hours" 
 Drop Dead Fred (1991)
 Highway to Hell (1992)
 Tödliche Lüge (1993) (TV) (alternative title: Die Wahrheit hinter den Kulissen) (Germany)
 All Men Are Mortal (1995)
 Eine kleine Nachtmerrie (1996) TV series
 Wenn ich nicht mehr lebe (1996) (TV)
 Wenn der Präsident 2x klingelt (1997) (TV)
 Die Straßen von Berlin (1 episode, 1999) - "Hackfleisch"
 Fogbound (2002)
 Ek lief jou (2011)
 Het Bombardement (2012)
 Deadly Virtues: Love.Honour.Obey. (2014)
 Love Is Thicker Than Water (2016)

Writer
 Alle dagen feest (1976) (Every Day a Party)
 Blindgangers (1977) (Blind Spot)
 Dag Dokter (1978) (Inheritance)
 Bekende gezichten, gemengde gevoelens (1980) (Known Faces, Mixed Feelings)
 Een vlucht regenwulpen (1981) (A Flight of Rainbirds)
 Brandende liefde (1983) (Burning Love)
 In de schaduw van de overwinning (1986) (Shadow of Victory)
 Een maand later (1987) (A Month Later)
 All Men Are Mortal (1995)
 Die Straßen von Berlin (1 episode, 1999)
 Fogbound (2002) (writer)

Producer
 Left Luggage (1998)
 Enigma (2001) (associate producer)
 The Discovery of Heaven (2001)
 Fogbound (2002) (producer)
 Summer Heat (2008) (producer)
 Zwart Water (2009) (post-production) (executive producer)

Self
 De Wereld draait door (2 episodes, 2007)
 Allemaal film (2 episodes, 2007)

References

External links

1953 births
Living people
Dutch film directors
Dutch film producers
Dutch screenwriters
Dutch male screenwriters
People from Sluis